Burn It Down may refer to:

Burn It Down (album), by the Dead Daisies, 2018
Burn It Down (band), an American metalcore band
Burn It Down Tour, a 2014–2015 concert tour by Jason Aldean

Songs
"Burn It Down" (Linkin Park song), 2012
"Burn It Down" (Ricki-Lee Coulter song), 2012
"Burn It Down", by Alter Bridge from One Day Remains, 2004
"Burn It Down", by Avenged Sevenfold from City of Evil, 2005
"Burn It Down", by Awolnation from Back from Earth, 2011
"Burn It Down", by Dexys Midnight Runners from Searching for the Young Soul Rebels, 1980
"Burn It Down", by Five Finger Death Punch from War Is the Answer, 2009
"Burn It Down", by Graham Coxon from Crow Sit on Blood Tree, 2001
"Burn It Down", by the Suicide Commandos, 1977
"Burn It Down", a 2019 single by Silverstein